KRVN 880 is an AM radio station in Lexington, Nebraska and serving most of the rural central and western part of the state.

The station features agricultural news programming during the day and classic country at night.

KRVN is one of two 50,000-watt stations in Nebraska, the other being KFAB in Omaha.  It is the second-most powerful station in the state; unlike KFAB, it is not a clear-channel, Class A station, but it does operate on a clear-channel frequency, on which WCBS in New York City is the dominant station.  KRVN broadcasts from a four-tower antenna array located in the middle of cornfields near Holdrege, Nebraska.  KRVN is Nebraska's primary entry point station for the Emergency Alert System.

Due to its transmitter power and central Nebraska's flat land (with near-perfect ground conductivity), KRVN boasts one of the largest coverage areas in the Western United States. During the day, tower #3 radiates the transmitter's full power to almost all of Nebraska's densely populated area, as well as more than half of Kansas and northeastern Colorado.  At night, power is fed to all four towers to provide a directional signal aimed to the west to protect WCBS. This results in the second-largest city within its coverage area, Kearney, only getting a grade B signal; a translator at 106.9 FM is used to make up for this shortfall. Even with this arrangement, it is able to cover western Nebraska, northwestern Kansas, northeastern Colorado, and most of the Dakotas.

KRVN is a member of the Nebraska Cornhuskers radio network.

The KRVN network is unique in that it is owned and operated by a cooperative of farmers and ranchers, the Nebraska Rural Radio Association. It was founded in 1948, opening its first station, KRVN, in 1951. It was originally located at 1010 AM, broadcasting with 10,000 watts.  In 1972, it moved to its current frequency and boosted its transmitting power to 50,000 watts; the lower dial position and stronger transmitter enabled it to serve more of central Nebraska's farmers.

The NRRA launched a sister music station with a similar callsign, KRVN-FM (River 93.1), in 1962.

References

External links

About KRVN – Includes a timeline of developments of the Nebraska Rural Radio Association's network
FCC History Cards for KRVN

RVN (AM)
News and talk radio stations in the United States